Rubbing Doesn't Help is the third album by Magnapop, released in 1996.

Recording
The sessions for Rubbing Doesn't Help were produced by Geza X at City Lab Studios in Hollywood, California in late 1995. Drummer David McNair left the group prior to recording, so they hired session musician Josh Freese to fill in on drums. This would be the band's final album for almost a decade; their record label folded while promoting Rubbing Doesn't Help and they were contractually barred from recording under that name. The band (along with Freese) also went to Plus Four Recordings Studios, in Sherman Oaks, California with engineers Sandy Solomon and Bernie Zwass in June 1995 to record their cover of Tom Waits' "Christmas Card from a Hooker in Minneapolis" for the compilation album Step Right Up: The Songs of Tom Waits. The title of the album comes from a Ben-Gay slogan.

Reception
{{Album ratings
|rev1=Allmusic
|rev1Score=<ref name="allmusic">
The album received mostly positive reviews, with some mixed responses. Positive critics noted the album's emotionally powerful lyrics in addition to its aggressive instrumentation—particularly the guitar. Ambivalent reviewers criticized the lack of variety between this album and Magnapop's previous efforts, as well as a lack of focus in the production.

Track listing
All songs written by Linda Hopper and Ruthie Morris, except where noted.
"This Family" – 3:28
"I Don't Care" – 2:40
"Open the Door" – 3:37
"Come on Inside" – 2:43
"Down on Me" – 3:24
"An Apology" – 3:04
"My Best Friend" – 3:26
"Juicy Fruit" – 2:18
"Firebrand" – 2:29
"Cherry Bomb" – 2:15
"Radio Waves" – 2:32
"Snake" (Hopper, Morris, and Shannon Mulvaney) – 5:00
"Dead Letter" – 3:32
Also includes the hidden track "Suck It Up"

Japanese edition bonus tracks
"Hold You Down" (New Mix) – 2:43
"Voice Without a Sound" – 2:41

The Dutch edition of the album has a slightly different track listing, with "Hold You Down" (3:29) as the fourth track and omitting "Cherry Bomb".

Tracks from Rubbing Doesn't Help
A promotional EP entitled Tracks from Rubbing Doesn't Help was released by Play It Again Sam in the United States in 1996 (catalogue number PROMOBIAS 033 CD) with the following track listing:

"This Family" – 3:28
"An Apology" – 3:04
"Open the Door" – 3:37
"My Best Friend" – 3:26
"Juicy Fruit" – 2:18
"Snake" – 5:00

Personnel
Magnapop
Linda Hopper – lead vocals, art direction, photography
Ruthie Morris – lead guitar, backing vocals, lead vocals on "Hold You Down" and "Suck It Up", dobro on "Dead Letter", art direction, photography
Shannon Mulvaney – bass guitar

Additional personnel
Jerry Finn – mixing on "Come on Inside"
Sherry Rae Etheredge – photography
Josh Freese – drums
Geza X – production, engineering
Maggie Magarian – design
Nancy Ogami – lettering
Eddie Shryer of Future Disc – mastering
Art Shoji – design
Steve Snow – sound design on "Come On Inside"
Thom Wilson – mixing

Release history
The album was initially released on Priority Records in the United States and Play It Again Sam in Europe, with the Japanese edition published by King.

†Special edition with bonus tracks

Sales chart performance

References

External links
Official site

 (Dutch edition)
Rubbing Doesn't Help at Discogs
Tracks from Rubbing Doesn't Help at Discogs

1996 albums
Albums produced by Geza X
King Records (Japan) albums
Magnapop albums
PIAS Recordings albums
Priority Records albums